Shazia Muqudos Khan (born 4 January 1981) is a Pakistani former cricketer who played as a batter. She appeared in one Test match and three One Day Internationals for Pakistan in 1998, all on the side's tour of Sri Lanka.

References

External links 
 
 

1981 births
Living people
People from Gujranwala District
Pakistan women Test cricketers
Pakistan women One Day International cricketers
Punjabi people